Mirjam Oldenhave (born 20 August 1960 in Hengelo) is a Dutch author of children's literature, and the author of the 2010 Kinderboekenweekgeschenk. Initially trained as a drama therapist, she taught drama and music in special education. She published her first children's book in 1998.

See also
List of publications during the Boekenweek

References

1960 births
Living people
Dutch children's writers
Dutch women children's writers
20th-century Dutch women writers
20th-century Dutch writers
People from Hengelo
21st-century Dutch women writers
21st-century Dutch writers